Queen U or romanized as Queen Woo (Hangul: 왕후 우씨, Hanja: 王后 于氏; d. 234), was a queen consort of Goguryeo as the wife of King Gogukcheon (Go Nammu) and later his younger brother, King Sansang (Go Yeonu) after his death. She was famous for maintaining her supreme position and power there, which even the king couldn't easily control it. Also, despite her action that is very different from others, she is recognized as an independent-minded woman who successfully lives according to her own desire and gave an example of a levirate marriage custom in Goguryeo. Due to this, she became one of the few women in the past who left a name and lifetime story in Korean history.

Life

During King Gogukcheon's reign
Lady U, as the daughter of U So (우소, 于素) from an unclear region (it might be Jenabu (제나부, 提那部) or Yeonnabu (연나부, 椽那部)) was married to Go Nammu, King Gogukcheon in 180 AD and became his queen consort not long after that. However, a rebellion started when the king tried to stop her relatives (including Eobiryu and Jwagaryeo) from abusing their power and their children were rude and arrogant by believing their authority and plundering other children with took their houses in 190. Besides this, no significant story about Queen U during Gogukcheon's reign.

During King Sansang's reign
After King Gogukcheon died without issue in 197, Queen U met his brother–Prince Balgi to discuss the throne's successor while keeping silent about the king's death. Yet, due to Balgi's optimistic thinking that he would ascend to the throne, she then completely ignored him and visited his other brother–Prince Yeonu. Unlike Balgi, Yeonu greeted Queen U politely and courteously, meaning she liked his behavior and plotted Balgi for treason, even asking Yeonu to take her with him.

The historical sources Samguk Sagi pointed out that, Yeonu who served U, cut the meat but his finger was injured by a knife, then U loosened her skirt strap and covered  his wound. The two then returned to the palace by holding hands with each other. Meanwhile, the anger Balgi fled to Liaodong and requested support from Gongsun Du, head of the Gongsun clan in Liaodong by borrowing 30,000 troops to invade Goguryeo. Knowing this, Balgi's youngest brother–Prince Gyesu subdued it, defeated him, and then rebuked him. Balgi then committed suicide due to his guilt for bringing a great crisis to his royal family and country.

After Balgi's death, Yeonu ascended the throne as King Sansang with Queen U's help and eventually made her his primary spouse or the queen consort in the same year. However, as they couldn't have any children, the king then had a prophecy that he could have a son through the other woman after praying in a mountain at night, but didn't dare to hire other consorts due to his respect for Queen U.

Upon knowing that her husband had a relationship with the other woman, Queen U became very angry and sent many soldiers to kill the woman he slept with. However, for the king's unborn child's sake, the soldiers didn't kill the woman and tell this to the king, which then formally made this woman a concubine under the title "Little Queen" (소후, 小后). Not long after this, the little queen gave birth to a son in 209 under Queen U's pressure and threat. Four years later, this boy formally became the crown prince.

During King Dongcheon's reign
Meanwhile, after King Sansang died in 227, his son–Prince Uwigeo ascended the throne as King Dongcheon although planned to be killed by Queen U since young. She, who was anxious to test his generosity, once had him cut the mane of his horse and on the other occasion, ordered a servant to spill soup on his clothes. Even so, Dongcheon was never angry and instead made her clan hold the most political influence by appointing them to the highest position of state minister, and also honouring her as the queen dowager (왕태후, 王太后).

U still became the queen dowager until her own death in 234 (8th year of the reign of King Dongcheon). Just before her death, she told her will by writing a letter requesting that she should be buried next to Sansang's tomb instead of Gogukcheon's tomb. When King Dongcheon read this, he planted seven layers of pine trees around Gogukcheon's tomb to hide and cover it.

In popular culture
Queen U appears as Woo Seo-ran (우서란) in the 2020 manhwa "The Queen's Empire" (왕후의 제국) by Hyuneung (현응).

References

Year of birth unknown
234 deaths
Goguryeo people
2nd-century Korean people
3rd-century Korean people
Korean royal consorts